Badiraguato is a small city and seat of the Badiraguato Municipality in the Mexican state of Sinaloa.

According to 2010 census, the city reported 3,725 inhabitants. The hamlet of La Tuna, located 110 kilometres to the North of the city, is the birthplace of Joaquín "El Chapo" Guzmán, for a long time one of Mexico's most powerful drug lords.

Badiraguato is located near the municipality of Culiacán. The Sierra Madre Occidental cross Badiragua and provide temperate forest ecosystems in parts of the municipality.

Badiraguato has a varied climate, from hot and arid to snowy forests in its higher parts. Areas vary from 44.5° Celsius, the hottest, to -9 °C degrees, the coldest.

Recent events
President Andrés Manuel López Obrador (AMLO) was widely criticized for meeting Consuela Loera, aged 92 at the time, and mother of convicted drug lord Joaquín "El Chapo" Guzmán, in Badiraguato during the COVID-19 pandemic in Mexico. Loera gave AMLO a letter asking that her son be repatriated to Mexico. Lopez Obrador said,

She is a 92-year-old lady and I already said, the fatal plague is corruption, not an older adult who deserves all my respect, regardless of who her son is. And I would keep doing it. Sometimes I have to shake hands, because that is my job, to white-collar criminals, who have not even lost their respectability. So how can I not give it to a lady?

Notable people from Badiraguato
 Arturo Beltrán Leyva, Mexican drug kingpin and one of the founders of Beltrán Leyva Cartel 
 Alfredo Beltrán Leyva, Mexican drug kingpin and one of the founders of Beltrán Leyva Cartel 
 Carlos Beltrán Leyva, Mexican drug kingpin and one of the founders of Beltrán Leyva Cartel 
 Héctor Beltrán Leyva, Mexican drug kingpin and one of the founders of Beltrán Leyva Cartel
Rafael Caro Quintero, Mexican drug kingpin and co-founder of the Guadalajara Cartel
Juan José Esparragoza Moreno, Mexican drug kingpin and co-founder of the Guadalajara Cartel
Joaquín "El Chapo" Guzmán, Mexican drug kingpin and former leader of the Sinaloa Cartel

References

Populated places in Sinaloa
Populated places established in 1605
1605 establishments in New Spain